Oltina is a commune in Constanța County, Northern Dobruja, Romania.

The commune includes four villages:
 Oltina (historical name: Goltina), named after the Roman settlement Altinum, whose vestiges were found in the vicinity of the village
 Răzoarele (historical name: Curuorman)
 Satu Nou (historical name: Ienichioi)
 Strunga (historical name: Câșla)

History

Demographics
At the 2011 census, 96.3% of the population of Oltina had Romanian ethnicity.

References

External links
 Oltina on the Constanţa County Council website

Communes in Constanța County
Localities in Northern Dobruja
Populated places on the Danube